Arthur Lee (May 4, 1881 – 1961) was an American sculptor, born in Trondheim, Norway. His family immigrated to the United States in 1888, settling in St. Paul, Minnesota. He studied at the Art Students League in New York City before returning to Europe to study the École des Beaux-Arts in Paris, as well as in Rome and London.

He was one of the more conservative artists who exhibited at the Armory Show in 1913 where he displayed eight drawings and sculptures and was one of a dozen sculptors invited to compete in the Pioneer Woman statue competition in 1927. He also taught; among his pupils was Eleanor Platt.

Lee was a member of the National Sculpture Society and the National Academy of Design.  He died in 1961.

References

1881 births
1961 deaths
20th-century American sculptors
20th-century American male artists
American male sculptors
People from Trondheim
People from Saint Paul, Minnesota
Norwegian emigrants to the United States
Art Students League of New York alumni
American alumni of the École des Beaux-Arts
National Academy of Design members
Sculptors from New York (state)
Sculptors from Minnesota
Section of Painting and Sculpture artists